Matthew Sloan (born March 24) is an American voice actor, director, writer, and YouTuber from Madison, Wisconsin. He and his friend Aaron Yonda are notable as the co-creators of the web series Chad Vader: Day Shift Manager, in which he voices the title character. Additionally, he appears in season one as the main antagonist, Clint. He later appeared in the first few episodes of the second series as Champion J. Pepper, Clint’s father. Since Chad Vader, he has gone on to voice Darth Vader in various Star Wars media as the sound double for James Earl Jones.

He hosts a movie reviewing and discussion show on YouTube called Welcome to the Basement with his friend Craig Johnson. Furthermore, he leads regularly with colleague friend Aaron Yonda in the web series Beer and Board Games.

Star Wars
As a voice actor, Sloan played Darth Vader in Soulcalibur IV. Sloan went on to reprise his role as the voice of Darth Vader in the LucasArts video games Star Wars: The Force Unleashed, and Star Wars: Empire at War: Forces of Corruption. He also appeared as the voice of Darth Vader during an episode of Deal or No Deal. Sloan also played Vader for the comedy short promoting TomTom devices. He returned as Vader for Star Wars: The Force Unleashed II. In 2012, Sloan voiced Darth Vader in both Lego Star Wars: The Empire Strikes Out and Kinect Star Wars. In 2015, Sloan returned to voice Vader in Disney Infinity 3.0, Star Wars Battlefront, Star Wars Battlefront II and multiple Lego Star Wars shorts and television series, as well as providing his voice for a sketch in the final episode of The Daily Show with Jon Stewart.

Filmography

Television

Video games

See also
Star Wars parodies
Wil Wheaton - voice actor and host of TableTop

References

External links
 Blame Society Productions - Official website
 

American male comedians
American male video game actors
American male voice actors
American male web series actors
American YouTubers
Living people
Writers from Madison, Wisconsin
St. Norbert College alumni
21st-century American male actors
21st-century American comedians
Comedy YouTubers
Year of birth missing (living people)